Kennedy Malunga (born 14 May 1970) is a former Malawi international football midfielder who plays for clubs in Malawi, South Africa and Belgium.

Club career
Born in Malawi, Malunga played football in the local league for MTL Wanderers. He joined South African side Mamelodi Sundowns F.C. with his brother, Holman, in August 1985.

He joined Belgian Pro League side Cercle Brugge K.S.V. for the 1987-88 season, but made only one competitive appearance for the club, while finishing sixth in the voting for 1987 African Player of the Year. He moved to K.V. Kortrijk the following season.

In 1990, Malunga returned to South Africa to play for Dynamos F.C. and Port Elizabeth Blackpool.

International career
Malunga made several appearances for the Malawi national football team, including two FIFA World Cup qualifying matches. He won a bronze medal with Malawi at the 1987 All-Africa Games in Nairobi.

References

External links

Profile at Cerclemusuem.be

1970 births
Living people
Malawian footballers
Malawian expatriate footballers
Malawi international footballers
Mamelodi Sundowns F.C. players
Cercle Brugge K.S.V. players
K.V. Kortrijk players
Belgian Pro League players
Expatriate footballers in Belgium
Expatriate soccer players in South Africa
Malawian expatriate sportspeople in South Africa
African Games bronze medalists for Malawi
African Games medalists in football
Association football midfielders
Competitors at the 1987 All-Africa Games
Dynamos F.C. (South Africa) players